The Bergamasco Shepherd, is an Italian breed of sheepdog. It originated in the Alpi e Prealpi Bergamasche, where it was used as a herding dog for both sheep and cattle.

History 

The origins of the Pastore Bergamasco are unknown. A genetic study in 2018 found evidence of haplotypes shared with other European breeds including the Berger Picard, the Bernese Mountain Dog and the Briard.

A dog of this type was exhibited at the first Italian dog show in Milan in 1881. The first registration of the breed in the Libro Origini Italiano, the Italian national stud-book for dogs, was in 1891. The breed was recognised by the Ente Nazionale della Cinofilia Italiana in 1956, and was definitively accepted by the Fédération Cynologique Internationale in the same year.

In the nine years from 2011 to 2019, annual registrations in Italy averaged 97 per year, with a maximum of 149 and a minimum of 48.

Characteristics 

The Bergamasco is a robust and rustic dog of medium size, solidly built and well proportioned. It is roughly square in outline when seen from the side – the length of the body is approximately equal to the height at the withers.

It is characterised by a long thick coat which covers every part of the dog. Particularly on the hind part of the body, the coat forms long matted locks which provide good protection from bad weather; on the fore part of the body the hair is coarse and forms wavy ringlets like those of a goat, while the hair on the head is rather finer. The coat may be of any shade of grey, from very pale to matt black; some tinges of isabella or fulvous colour are allowable.

References 

FCI breeds
Herding dogs
Dog breeds originating in Italy
Rare dog breeds